The 1996 Cup of Russia was the sixth event of six in the 1996–97 ISU Champions Series, a senior-level international invitational competition series. It was held in Saint Petersburg on December 12–15. Medals were awarded in the disciplines of men's singles, ladies' singles, pair skating, and ice dancing. Skaters earned points toward qualifying for the 1996–97 Champions Series Final.

Results

Men

Ladies

Pairs

Ice dancing

External links
 1996 Cup of Russia

Cup of Russia
Cup of Russia
Rostelecom Cup